Implicit personality theory describes the specific patterns and biases an individual uses when forming impressions based on a limited amount of initial information about an unfamiliar person. While there are parts of the impression formation process that are context-dependent, individuals also tend to exhibit certain tendencies in forming impressions across a variety of situations. There is not one singular implicit personality theory utilized by all; rather, each individual approaches the task of impression formation in his or her own unique way. However, there are some components of implicit personality theories that are consistent across individuals, or within groups of similar individuals. These components are of particular interest to social psychologists because they have the potential to give insight into what impression one person will form of another.

One of the first psychologists to extensively explore the concept of impression formation was Solomon Asch. His research, dating back to the mid-1940s, provided a substantial amount of the initial data explaining factors that affect impression formation. He was particularly interested in the differences between central and peripheral traits. Many of the ideas produced from Asch's experiments are still relevant to the study of impression formation, and have played a significant role in establishing a foundation for modern implicit personality theory research.

Automaticity
One of the most notable characteristics of implicit personality theories is that they are, in fact, implicit. In this context, "implicit" is taken to mean "automatic". It is a common belief that much of the process of social perception actually is automated. For example, it is possible for a person to experience automatic thought processes, and for those processes occur without that person's intention or awareness of their occurrence. In terms of impression formation, this means that an observer may perceive another person's behavior and automatically make trait inferences from that behavior, without being aware that these inferences were being made.  The strongest evidence for the implicitness of impression formation comes from observed "savings effects" when trying to learn another person's traits. In a study by Carlston & Skowronski (1994), participants who were exposed to descriptive stimuli containing implied trait information learned the target person's traits more easily than participants who had not been previously exposed to implied trait information. Moreover, this effect could not be accounted for by simple priming mechanisms. The participants exhibited a true savings effect, which suggested that they had gained implicit trait information from the descriptive stimuli.

General theories

Consistency theory
Consistency, in terms of implicit personality theories, refers to the way in which a newly formed impression that relates to what is already known about the other person. There are two dimensions of consistency involved with inferring traits in respect to the other known traits of a person. Evaluative consistency suggests that inferred traits will match the overall impression of the person formed by the traits of that person that have already been established. There is a tendency to infer favorable traits to people who have already exhibited mostly favorable traits. Likewise, evaluative consistency implies that if a person is known to have mostly unfavorable traits, others will likely attribute other unfavorable traits to that individual. On the other hand, descriptive consistency suggests that trait inferences about a person occur when there are similarities between the descriptive attributes of the person and the assumed trait. An example of two traits that are descriptively similar are "skeptical" and "distrustful".  An observer using descriptive similarity to form an impression of a "skeptical" person would most likely also believe that person to be "distrustful", because these two traits similarly describe a person who questions what other people tell him.

Both dimensions of consistency can be used in forming impressions and inferring traits-one is not more "correct" than the other. Most likely they are used in sequence, with descriptive consistency used before evaluative consistency is enacted. A study by Felipe (1970) revealed that, after traits that exhibit both evaluative and descriptive consistency, traits that are descriptively but not evaluatively consistent ("stingy" and "firm") are assumed to co-occur more often than traits that show evaluative but not descriptive consistency ("stingy" and "over permissive"). However, evaluative consistency is preferred in scenarios when making a quick, "all-or-nothing" judgment is necessary.

Attribution theory
Attribution theory describes how people view trait stability in another person. This theory does not deal exclusively with traits, but rather describes a general worldview a person takes in life. The two main attribute theories are entity theory and incremental theory. People who exhibit entity theory tend to believe that traits are fixed and stable over time and across situations. When making judgments about a person's behavior, they are inclined to emphasize the traits of that person. Moreover, entity theorists tend to make assumptions about others' traits based on a limited sample of their behaviors. Incremental theorists believe that traits are more dynamic and can vary over time. They also place less significance on traits when interpreting another person's actions, focusing rather on other types of mediators that may be influencing their behavior. The biggest distinguishing factor between these two theories is that entity theorists tend to make stronger and broader inferences from traits than incremental theorists do. This distinction holds true even when there are situational explanations for the observed behavior, and when the behavior is unintentional. Because entity theorists believe that traits are stable over time, they are more confident in attributing a person's behavior to their traits.

Factors affecting implicit personality theories

Central vs. peripheral traits
When forming an impression, an observer does not weigh every observed trait equally. There are some traits that the observer will consider more than others when forming his ultimate impression. This concept was a main focus of Asch's research on impression formation. Asch termed the highly influential traits which have a strong effect on overall impression as central traits, and the less influential traits which produced smaller effects on overall impression he called peripheral traits. According to Asch, the defining feature of a central trait is that it plays a significant role in determining the content and function of other traits. In the very first study he performed, Asch found that participants asked to form an impression of a person who was "intelligent, skillful, industrious, warm, determined, practical, and cautious" formed significantly different impressions than participants asked to describe a person who was "intelligent, skillful, industrious, cold, determined, practical, and cautious". Furthermore, when these participants were asked to rate which traits on the list were the most important to the formation of their impression, most reported that "warm" (or "cold") was one of the most influential traits on the list. Asch then performed the same experiment using "polite" and "blunt" in place of "warm" and "cold" and found that a change in these two traits had a much weaker effect on the overall impression than changing from "warm" to "cold". Additionally, when a negative central trait such as "cold" is inserted in a list of positive peripheral traits, it has a greater overall effect on the impression than a positive central trait such as "warm" does when it is inserted into a list of negative peripheral traits.

Effect of observer traits
In general, the more an observer believes he exhibits a trait, the more likely the observer is to notice that same trait in other people. In addition, a study by Benedetti & Joseph (1960) showed that some specific observer traits could be significant factors in the impressions that the observer forms of another person. However, this effect is highly variable across various traits and contexts. For example, as compared to outgoing people, those who are more reserved tend to form more positive impressions of other reserved people. However, this pattern was not found when the outgoing people were being judged. In this case, about the same number of outgoing and reserved people attributed other positive traits to the outgoing person. A possible explanation for the observer's tendency to form more positive impressions of people who are similar to him involves the theory of intergroup bias. The idea of intergroup bias suggests that people tend to judge members of their own group more favorably than nonmembers. Under this assumption, reserved people would consider other unsociable people to be in their own group, and would rate them more favorably than people in the outgoing group would.

Self-Based Heuristic
The self-based heuristic describes the strategy that observers use when they are provided limited trait information about another person, in which case they proceed to "fill in the gaps" with trait information that reflects their own personality. This "filling in" occurs because trait information about the observer's personality is the most easily accessible information the observer's disposal. A common explanation for limited availability of trait information is that some traits are more difficult to judge than others. For example, a trait like extraversion is easy for another person to observe, and is therefore easier to judge in another person than a trait like general affect is. Therefore, when a trait has few external indicators, an observer is more likely to assume another person embodies that trait in a similar way as the observer does. It is important to note, however, that the self-based heuristic is negatively correlated with agreement. In other words, the more an observer uses the self-based heuristic, the less likely it is that he or she is making a correct trait judgment.

Primacy effect
The primacy effect describes the tendency to weigh information learned first more heavily than information learned later. In terms of impression formation, the primacy effect indicates that the order in which a person's traits are presented affects the overall impression formed about that person. This effect prevails both when forming impressions of a hypothetical person and when asked to form an impression of a target person with whom the observer has actually interacted. Asch hypothesized that the reason for the primacy effect in impression formation is that the first traits learned produce the general direction in which an impression will be formed. After that, all subsequent traits are interpreted in a way that coincides with this established trend. The primacy effect can also be explained in terms of memory. As the short-term memory becomes more and more crowded with trait information, less attention can be given to newer details. Consequently, information learned early on has a greater influence on impression formation because it receives more attention and is remembered more clearly than later information.

Mood
Mood can play an influential role in impression formation by affecting the way the primacy effect is used when making judgments. Being in a positive mood causes a person to process information in a holistic, all-inclusive fashion while being in a negative mood encourages more adaptive processing which accounts for each detail individually. Therefore, positive mood tends to increase the influence of early information while negative mood has the opposite effect. There is also evidence of a mood-congruent factor, where people in good moods form positive impressions and people in bad moods form negative impressions. This is most likely due to the selective priming of information associated with the current mood state, which causes mood-congruent biases in impression formation.

Potential drawbacks of implicit personality theories
Although there are many advantages to using implicit personality theories when forming impressions, there is some danger in relying too heavily on these theories. In addition to the aforementioned self-based heuristic, another one of the most common misuses of implicit personality theory is when observers believe two traits are more highly correlated than they are in reality. This fallacy can take two forms: the halo effect and logical error. The halo effect describes the tendency of an observer to form a generally favorable, unfavorable, or average impression of a specific person, and to allow that general impression to have an exaggerated effect on their judgments of that person along other trait dimensions. A very common example of the halo effect is when an observer considers attractiveness a favorable trait, and then assumes that a very attractive person whom he meets is also extremely friendly or helpful, because these traits are also favorable.  On the other hand, a logical error fallacy is made when observers make judgments about trait relationships based on correlations they believe make sense logically, instead of forming these connections based on observations of real-life trait relationships. An example of making the logical error would be assuming that a person who is physically strong and muscular is also athletic. This trait relationship makes logical sense, but without observations to back it up, assuming this relationship would be making the logical error. While both the halo effect and the logical error fallacy result in unfounded trait correlations, the difference is that the halo effect refers to trait correlations of a specific person, while the logical error is more generalizable across the population, and refers to trait correlations that are made with no regard to specific individuals' behaviors.

References

Interpersonal relationships